In biology, Lacrymaria is the name of two distinct genera:
 Lacrymaria (fungus), a genus of mushrooms in the family Psathyrellaceae
 Lacrymaria (ciliate), a genus of unicellular protists